Moogouei, Mougouei, Mogouei, (Persian: موگویی) may refer to:
Moogouei (Clan): A clan of the Chahar Lang branch of the Bakhtiari people.
Moogouei (Family): The chief family of the Moogouei clan. 
Moogouei (Surename): Used by some members of the Moogouei family and adopted by some of their associates. 
Moogouei (Geographical Area)